Sankt Gallen may refer to:

 St. Gallen, town in Switzerland
 Canton of St. Gallen, Switzerland
 Abbey of Saint Gall, Switzerland
 Sankt Gallen, Styria, municipality in Austria
 St. Gall (disambiguation)

See also
 Gallen (disambiguation)